Kim Hae-nam (born 23 May 1929) was a South Korean former weightlifter. He competed at the 1952, 1956, 1960 and the 1964 Summer Olympics.

References

External links
 

1929 births
Possibly living people
South Korean male weightlifters
Olympic weightlifters of South Korea
Weightlifters at the 1952 Summer Olympics
Weightlifters at the 1956 Summer Olympics
Weightlifters at the 1960 Summer Olympics
Weightlifters at the 1964 Summer Olympics
20th-century South Korean people